The Virginia Beach Mariners were an American soccer club, who formerly played in the USL First Division of the United Soccer Leagues, the second division in the US Soccer hierarchy behind Major League Soccer. On March 30, 2007 the team folded due to lack of ownership.

The Mariners played at the Virginia Beach Sportsplex in Virginia Beach, Virginia, from 1999 up to their demise in 2007.

The team was founded in 1994 as the Hampton Roads Hurricanes, but they changed their name to Mariners after the first year.  For the 2003 season, the team changed their name from Hampton Roads Mariners to the more widely recognizable Virginia Beach Mariners. The team went on a one- year hiatus in 1997, after which they joined the A-League.

In 2006, the Mariners added a USL Premier Development League club, the Virginia Beach Submariners. Shortly after the termination of the Mariners, the Submariners were taken over by the Hampton Roads Piranhas, a women's W-League soccer club, who renamed the team the Hampton Roads Piranhas to reflect the change of ownership.

Year-by-year

Head coaches 
  Shawn McDonald (1996 - Aug 2005)
  Jay Hoffman (Aug 2005-2006)

See also 
 USL First Division teams

External links
 Virginia Pilot article announcing the team's March 2007 demise
 Press Release announcing Hampton Roads Piranhas Mens PDL Team
 Virginia Pilot - "No one knew the hope of the tanking Mariners was broke"

Association football clubs established in 1994
Soccer clubs in Virginia
Sports in Virginia Beach, Virginia
USL First Division teams
A-League (1995–2004) teams
1994 establishments in Virginia
2007 disestablishments in Virginia
Soccer clubs in Hampton Roads
Association football clubs disestablished in 2007
Defunct soccer clubs in Virginia